Asle Andersen (born 15 February 1972) is a Norwegian football manager and former player. He was the manager of Sandnes Ulf from 2006 to July 2014.

References

External links 
 

Living people
1972 births
Sportspeople from Stavanger
Norwegian footballers
Viking FK players
Bryne FK players
FK Haugesund players
Sandnes Ulf players
Norwegian football managers
Sandnes Ulf managers
Association football midfielders
Eliteserien managers